The Volkswagen ID.6 is a battery electric mid-size crossover SUV with three-row seating produced by Volkswagen in China from 2021. It is based on the MEB platform, and part of the ID. series electric vehicle line-up. In China, the FAW-Volkswagen joint venture will produce and market the ID.6 Crozz, whereas SAIC-Volkswagen will build and market the ID.6 X with a slightly altered styling. As of April 2021, it is the largest vehicle of the Volkswagen ID. series, and the largest built on the MEB platform.

Overview

Pre-production 
The ID.6 is based on the Volkswagen I.D. Roomzz concept. This was first presented at the Shanghai Motor Show in April 2019. The concept is a family SUV, based on the MEB platform, with sliding doors at the front and rear with opposite opening.

Production version 
The ID.6 was revealed in 17 April 2021 for the Chinese market. Two versions with different front and rear fascia styling is announced, which are the ID.6 Crozz produced by FAW-VW and the ID.6 X produced by SAIC-VW. The ID.6 is built on the VW Group MEB platform shared with the Volkswagen ID.4, Škoda Enyaq iV as well as the Audi Q4 e-tron.

VW will sell the ID.6 in China with a choice between six or seven seats while alloy wheel sizes will range from 19 to 21 inches.

References

ID.6
Cars introduced in 2021
Mid-size sport utility vehicles
Crossover sport utility vehicles
Production electric cars
Rear-wheel-drive vehicles
All-wheel-drive vehicles